Special Killers (Italian title: La ragazza di via Condotti, French title: Meurtres à Rome or Le crime de la via Condotti, Spanish title: La chica de via Condotti) is a 1973 Italian-French-Spanish crime-thriller film directed by Germán Lorente. The film stars are Frederick Stafford, Femi Benussi, Claude Jade and Michel Constantin.

Plot
An attractive brunette, Simone Mattei (Patty Shepard) is drunk and argues with her husband Sandro (Frederick Stafford). This visits his best friend Tiffany (Claude Jade) and complains her his suffering in the marriage crisis. While Sandro stays at Tiffany, Simone makes love with a lover. The tough guy penetrates her and starts at the same time to strangle her. He keeps on strangling the beauty until she is dead. An hour later, Sandro, who is a private investigator, finds his dead wife Simone. He comments the murder with "poor little bitch", but beside the victim he also discovers a photo showing a man on a motorcycle and a woman with glasses in the background. Now he wants to find the murderer. His girlfriend Tiffany, who works as a photographer, makes a "Blow-up" from the photograph. Tiffany recognizes as the woman with glasses a certain Laura Damiani (Femi Benussi). Sandro and Tiffany are looking for her and they found her as stripper in a night club in Rome. While Tiffany has an unrequited crush on him, Sandro start to fall in love with Laura, mistress of an unscrupulous lawyer (Alberto de Mendoza). And Laura is mixed up in blackmail, crimes and shady business.

Cast
Frederick Stafford as Sandro
Femi Benussi as Laura
Claude Jade as Tiffany
Michel Constantin as Palma
Alberto de Mendoza as Russo
Simón Andreu as Mario
Manuel de Blas as Franco Bertoni 
Patty Shepard as Simone 
Dada Gallotti as Gina Necioni 
Pupo de Luca as Taxi Driver
Giuseppe Castellano as Broccole 
Arturo Dominici as District Attorney
Giacomo Furia as Bartender

References

External links
 
 

1973 films
Italian crime thriller films
French crime thriller films
Spanish crime thriller films
1970s crime thriller films
1970s Italian-language films
1970s Italian films
1970s French films